Chang Ming-huang (born 7 August 1982 in Taichung) is a Taiwanese discus thrower and shot putter.

He has been focusing on shot put only since 2006. He trained in National College of Physical Education during his university study in Taiwan. He also has trained in China for a period. He has trained with Werner Goldmann in Berlin from June 2007 until 2008 Olympic Games in Beijing.

He has been training with Donald Babbitt in Athens, GA, USA, since Feb 2010. His personal best shot-put throw is 20.58 metres, achieved in Aug 2011 in Athens, Georgia, USA. This is the national record in Taiwan. This performance qualified him for the 2012 London Olympic Games (standard A).

On 3 August 2012, Ming-Huang threw 20.25 meters in the qualification round of the Men's Shot-Put at the London Olympic Games and became the 2nd Asian athlete to get into the final in the history of the event. Later in the evening, he threw 19.99 meters and was ranked 12th in the final.

Ming-Huang is sponsored by Chinese Taipei Athletics Association (CTAA) & Taiwan Sport Administration of Ministry of Education and Adidas. CTAA represents Ming-Huang Chang for all foreign affairs.

Ming-Huang is also employed by National Taiwan University of Physical Education and Sport as a throwing coach.

Achievements

References

1982 births
Living people
Sportspeople from Taichung
Taiwanese discus throwers
Taiwanese shot putters
Taiwanese male athletes
Male discus throwers
Male shot putters
Olympic athletes of Taiwan
Athletes (track and field) at the 2008 Summer Olympics
Athletes (track and field) at the 2012 Summer Olympics
Asian Games medalists in athletics (track and field)
Asian Games silver medalists for Chinese Taipei
Asian Games bronze medalists for Chinese Taipei
Athletes (track and field) at the 2006 Asian Games
Athletes (track and field) at the 2010 Asian Games
Athletes (track and field) at the 2014 Asian Games
Athletes (track and field) at the 2018 Asian Games
World Athletics Championships athletes for Chinese Taipei
Universiade medalists in athletics (track and field)
Medalists at the 2006 Asian Games
Medalists at the 2010 Asian Games
Medalists at the 2014 Asian Games
Universiade bronze medalists for Chinese Taipei
Medalists at the 2007 Summer Universiade